Melvin Lindsey (July 8, 1955March 26, 1992) was an American radio and television personality in the Washington, D.C. area.  He is widely known for originating the "Quiet Storm" late-night music programming format.

Lindsey began his broadcast career as an intern at Howard University radio station WHUR-FM. In 1976, he brought the "Quiet Storm" to the station's late-night lineup, titled after a romantic hit single by tenor crooner Smokey Robinson. The show's soulfully melodic and moody musical fare made it a phenomenal success, and the 'love song'-heavy format was quickly replicated at stations across the country that served an urban, African-American adult demographic.  Lindsey's show also gave rise to a category of music of the same name.

After a nine-year run on WHUR, Lindsey took his format to another local radio station, WKYS-FM, for five more years, and later he hosted Screen Scene for Black Entertainment Television (BET).  He also worked for Washington, D.C. television stations WTTG-TV and WFTY-TV and for WJZ-TV in Baltimore, Maryland.

Lindsey died at the age of 36 from complications of AIDS in 1992, but the Quiet Storm format he originated gained widespread popularity.   It remained popular over 4 decades after its inception across the nation, especially in evening and late-night radio programs. Artists continue to compose songs target the audiences of Quiet Storm stations and shows.

See also

Quiet storm
 A Quiet Storm – the Smokey Robinson record where the song "Quiet Storm" appeared
Vaughn Harper

References

External links

1955 births
1992 deaths
African-American television personalities
Journalists from Washington, D.C.
American radio personalities
American television reporters and correspondents
AIDS-related deaths in Washington, D.C.
20th-century African-American people